Phanuelus is a spider genus of the jumping spider family, Salticidae. The single described species Phanuelus gladstone is endemic to India. The holotype and paratypes of P. gladstone were all collected from the campus of Madras Christian College in Chennai. Adult spiders are 3–4 mm in length with a short, high carapace and rounded abdomen.

The genus is named after G. J. Phanuel, a professor at Madras Christian College who worked on the spiders of Chennai in the early 1960s.

References

Salticidae
Spiders of the Indian subcontinent
Monotypic Salticidae genera